Aventin is an old and uncommon Russian male first name. Its feminine version is Aventina. The name is derived from Aventinus, which is the Latin name of the Aventine Hill, one of the hills on which the city of Rome was built.

The diminutives of "Aventin" are Aventinka, Ava, Venya, Vena, and Tina.

The patronymics derived from "Aventin" are "" (Aventinovich; masculine) and "" (Aventinovna; feminine).

See also
 Saint Aventin, a French Saint and a hermit of the 8th century

References

Notes

Sources
Н. А. Петровский (N. A. Petrovsky). "Словарь русских личных имён" (Dictionary of Russian First Names). ООО Издательство "АСТ". Москва, 2005. 

